Twifu Praso is a town and is the district capital of Twifu/Atii/Morkwaa District Assembly of the Central Region.

Transport 
Twifo Praso was previously served by a station on the central cross-country line of the national railway system. The railroad is presently defunct, although the rails are for the most part still present.

See also 
 Railway stations in Ghana

References

External links 
 Twifu Praso at ghana-net

Populated places in the Central Region (Ghana)